Glass of antimony, vitrum antimonii, is a yellow to red, translucent glass created from a preparation of antimony, though historically used as an emetic, the glass was a subject of much interest from alchemists due to its unusual properties. It was created using crude antimony, ground and calcined by a vehement fire, in an earthen crucible, until it no longer fumed, indicating that its sulfur was evaporated. The remaining substance (antimony trioxide) was then vitrified in a wind furnace, and stirred with an iron rod, upon which it became translucent and displayed a ruddy and shining yellow-red color.

It has been considered the strongest emetic of any preparation of antimony. Yet, if dissolved in spirit of urine, it ceased to be either emetic or cathartic.

See also 
 Antimonial
 Antimonial cup

References

Emetics
Glass types
Drugs with no legal status
Antimony